Ünlüce can refer to:

 Ünlüce, Çine
 Ünlüce, Hınıs
 Ünlüce, Tut
 Ünlüce, Yüreğir